L'Arche is an international federation of non-profits working to create networks of community where people with and without intellectual disabilities live and work together. Founded in 1964 by Jean Vanier, Raphaël Simi, and Philip Seux, L'Arche emerged as a reaction and community-based alternative to the ill-treatment and dismal living conditions in the psychiatric institutions of the 1960s. Initially formed in the French commune of Trosly-Breuil, it subsequently expanded to over 150 communities in 38 countries worldwide.

Community
L'Arche homes and programs operate according to a not-for-profit "community model" which is distinct from "client-centered", medical, or social service models of care. At L'Arche,
 people with disabilities, and those who assist them, live together in homes and apartments, sharing life with one another and building community as responsible adults.
 everyone is believed to have the capacity to grow and to mature into adulthood, and to make a contribution to society, regardless of the physical or intellectual limitations with which they may be living; and
 the important goals of achieving personal growth and maturing socially as an adult are things which are understood to be nurtured most effectively within the context of a community whose policies and practices support and promote, among other things:
 the development of long-term, mutual, interdependent relationships;
 the maintenance of a stable, life-giving home environment;
 the training and ongoing formation of those who provide assistance to community members with disabilities; and
 cooperation with outside professional care providers.

L'Arche is a faith-based organization rooted in Christianity, but is open to people of any faith and people with no religious affiliation.

History
In 1964, through his friendship with Thomas Philippe, a Roman Catholic priest of the Dominican Order, Vanier became aware of the plight of thousands of people institutionalized with developmental disabilities. Vanier felt led by God to invite two men, Raphael Simi and Philippe Seux, to leave the institutions where they resided and share their lives with him in a household in Trosly-Breuil, France. He named their home "L'Arche", which is French for "The Ark", as in Noah's Ark. A collection of audiovisual material from L'Arche Trosly-Breuil is available at the University of St. Michael's College at the University of Toronto.

The first community in Canada, L'Arche Daybreak, was founded in 1969 in Richmond Hill, Ontario, near Toronto. Sue Mosteller, who lived with the Daybreak community for 40 years, acted as L'Arche's first International Coordinator after Jean Vanier. Dutch priest and spiritual writer Henri Nouwen also lived with the Daybreak community for several years until his death in 1996. He wrote about his experiences with Jean Vanier, L'Arche and the Daybreak community in his books The Road to Daybreak: A Spiritual Journey and Adam: God's Beloved. The institutional and community archives of the Daybreak community are located at the St. Michael's College, Toronto.

The first community in the UK was founded in 1973 in Barfrestone, Kent, through the efforts of Jean Vanier's sister, Thérèse Vanier. L'Arche Kent has since grown into a community of three traditional L'Arche houses, a gardening project called "The Glebe" and supported living apartments for twelve people with disabilities.

Although L'Arche communities are found in many different cultures and reflect the ethnic and religious composition of the locales in which they exist, they share a common philosophy and approach. People with developmental disabilities and those who assist them live and work together to create homes. The L'Arche Charter says, "In a divided world, L'Arche wants to be a sign of hope. Its communities, founded on covenant relationships between people of differing intellectual capacity, social origin, religion and culture, seek to be signs of unity, faithfulness and reconciliation." The charter further outlines the objectives, the principles and the identity of L'Arche.

All the Communities of the International Federation of L'Arche are committed to living these principles.  In March 2008, the international councils of L'Arche and another organization for disabled people founded by Vanier, Faith and Light, met for the first time in joint meeting in Lviv, Ukraine.  The international council of L'Arche was represented by 30 people from 14 countries, and the international council of Faith and Light was represented by 19 people from 17 countries, including France, Belgium, Switzerland, Great Britain, Ireland, India, Canada, US, Dominican Republic, Honduras, Brazil, Uganda, New Zealand, Philippines, and Italy.

Funding
L'Arche communities are funded differently, depending on where they are located. In Canada, the UK, France and other developed countries, they are funded by the relevant governmental body.  In less economically developed countries they rely more on local donations and on donations from other L'Arche communities and worldwide.

Sexual abuse investigation
In February 2020, L'Arche published the results of an investigation which found that Vanier had engaged in "manipulative and emotionally abusive" sexual relationships with six women between 1970 and 2005, under the guise of giving spiritual guidance. In response, the organisation stated "we are shocked by these discoveries and unreservedly condemn these actions, which are in total contradiction with the values Jean Vanier claimed and are incompatible with the basic rules of respect and integrity of persons, and contrary to the fundamental principles on which L'Arche is based".

Bibliography

References

External links
 Podcast of "Speaking of Faith"

Catholic charities
Disability organizations
International charities
International organizations based in France
Christian ecumenical organizations
Religious service organizations
Charities based in France
International associations of the faithful
Vanier family